Janet C. Howard was a member of the Ohio Senate from -1998, representing the 9th District, which encompasses much of Cincinnati, Ohio. She was succeeded by Mark Mallory, who defeated her in 1998 during her reelection campaign.

References

External links

Ohio Senate website
Profile on the Ohio Ladies Gallery website

Republican Party Ohio state senators
Living people
Women state legislators in Ohio
Year of birth missing (living people)
21st-century American women